Giovanni Porzio (6 October 1873 – 22 September 1962) was an Italian politician and lawyer. He served as Deputy Prime Minister of Italy from 1948 to 1950.

Biography
He graduated at the Vittorio Emanuele II High School in Naples and graduated in law at the University of Naples Federico II, then began his forensic activity by collaborating with the lawyer and scholar Alfonso Ridola, with Alberto Geremicca (who would later was mayor of Naples).

Subsequently he exercised autonomously and as a brilliant criminal lawyer at the Court of Naples and in Campania, acquiring a reputation that he maintained once he entered the Chamber, in March 1912, remaining among the counters of deputies until 1929.

Liberal, he became an Undersecretary for Justice in the Nitti government (from March to May 1920), then undersecretary in the second Nitti government (May–June 1920), joining the Undersecretariat to the presidency of the council in the last government of Giovanni Giolitti (from June 1920 to July 1921). To his electors he affirmed the necessity of defending the prestige of the state, safeguarding the order by repressing every attempt at violence, be it red or in opposition to it.

For the policies of 1924 he accepted to enter the list, but, disappointed by fascism, he withdrew from politics in 1929.

His political career resumed after liberation, first as a consultor and then as a constituent.

In 1948 he was appointed senator of law ex-III disp. trans. of the Italian Constitution, by virtue of the six previous legislatures.

He was also president of the Naples Bar Association.

External links
 Commemorazione di Enrico De Nicola a palazzo Marginali, fatta da Giovanni Porzio, Istituto Luce, 3 December 1959.

1873 births
1962 deaths
20th-century Italian politicians
Deputy Prime Ministers of Italy
20th-century Italian lawyers
Italian Liberal Party politicians
Members of the Senate of the Republic (Italy)
People from Portici
University of Naples Federico II alumni